Oleg Nikolaevich Ken (March 13, 1960, Orsk, - October 28, 2007, Saint Petersburg) was a Russian historian who worked in Saint Petersburg at Herzen University and European University at Saint Petersburg and specialized in the history of the Soviet Union, Poland and European diplomacy of the 1920s-1930s.

Oleg Ken was born in Orsk, Orenburg Oblast, where his family lived in exile owing to their ethnic German origin. He entered undergraduate studies at Orel Pedagogical Institute, but in 1979 moved to Leningrad and in 1981 graduated from the Department of History of Leningrad State Pedagogical University. In 1990 Ken defended his Kandidat nauk thesis "Great Britain and European security (1933-1935)". Since 1994 he had worked at European University at Saint Petersburg, where he was Secretary for Academic Affairs and earned his Doktor nauk degree. In 2005 he was appointed Full Professor at Herzen University. He died from heart failure in his sleep in his apartment on October 28, 2007.

References

External links
Personal website of Oleg Ken
Oleg Ken @ European University at Saint Petersburg
Oleg Ken Трагедия соперничающих невозможностей Neprikosnovenny Zapas  N2 (22) 2002 
Oleg Ken System Error? Москва и западные соседи в 1920-е — 1930-е годы N4 (24) 2002 
Oleg Ken Сталин как стратег (между двумя войнами) Russian Journal (website) 26 August 2004 
Oleg Ken Путин и Сталин // сходство языка и мышления Delo 13 September 2004 
Oleg Ken Превентивная коррекция памяти // Почему День Победы — 9 мая? Delo 24 April 2006 
Oleg Ken "Работа по истории" и стратегия авторитаризма, 1935-1937 гг. 

1960 births
2007 deaths
Writers from Saint Petersburg
20th-century Russian historians
European University at Saint Petersburg
21st-century Russian historians
Herzen University alumni
Academic staff of Herzen University